Sir Gilbert John Baptist Muria is a Solomon Islands judge and was the first indigenous Solomon Islander to be Chief Justice of the Solomon Islands.

Muria was Chief Justice of the Solomon islands from 1992 to 2003. He then sat as a judge on the courts of Sierra Leone from 2003 to 2006, sitting on each of the High Court of Sierra Leone, the Court of Appeal of Sierra Leone, and the Supreme Court of Sierra Leone. In 2007, the Commonwealth Secretariat facilitated Muria becoming a justice of the Supreme Court of Belize, where he remained until 2010. Muria was Chief Justice of the High Court of Kiribati from 2011 to 2020.

Muria was appointed as the Chancellor of the Solomon Islands National University, which was officially launched on 18 April 2013.

In 2021, Muria was appointed as a judge of the High Court of Tuvalu.

References

"Commonwealth Secretariat: Spotlight on Belize", thecommonwealth.org, 2010-03-15.

Living people
Solomon Islands judges
Solomon Islands judges on the courts of Belize
Solomon Islands judges on the courts of Kiribati
Solomon Islands judges on the courts of Sierra Leone
Expatriate judges on the courts of Tuvalu
Supreme Court of Belize justices
Chief justices
Year of birth missing (living people)
20th-century Solomon Islands lawyers